The UBC Thunderbirds women's ice hockey program represent the University of British Columbia in the Canada West Universities Athletic Association.  The Thunderbirds have won four conference championships in U Sports women's ice hockey, most recently in 2022, and have made four national championship appearances.

History

Recent season-by-season record 
{| class="wikitable"
|-
| style="background:#fea;"|Won U Sports Championship
| style="background:#dfd;"|<small>Lost U Sports Championship</small>
| style="background:#d0e7ff;"|Conference Champions
| style="background:#fbb;"|League Leader
|}

Team captains
2019-20: Mathea Fischer

Thunderbirds in pro hockey

International
Melinda Choy : 2009 Winter Universiade
Christi Capozzi : 2013 Winter Universiade
Tatiana Rafter, Forward, : 2013 Winter Universiade
Kelly Murray, Defense, : 2017 Winter Universiade

Awards and honours
 Graham Thomas, 2012-13 U Sports Coach of the Year
All-CanadiansFirst TeamHaleigh Callison, 2005-06 First-Team All-Canadian
Sarah Casorso, 2013-14 First-Team All-Canadian 
Tatiana Rafter, 2013-14 USports First Team All-Canadian
Sarah Casorso, 2014-15 USports First-Team All-Canadian
Kelly Murray, 2016-17 USports First Team All-Canadian
Tory Micklash , 2018-19 USports First Team All-CanadianSecond TeamLucie Fortin, 2003-04 Second-Team All-Canadian
Danielle Dube, 2012-13 Second-Team All-Canadian
Cassandra Vilgrain, 2016-17 USports Second Team All-Canadian

U Sports All-Rookie
Melinda Choy, 2006-07 USports All-Rookie Team 
Rayna Cruickshank, 2009-10 USports All-Rookie Team 
Mairead Best, 2016-17 USports All-Rookie Team 
Rylind MacKinnon, 2018-19 USports All-Rookie Team

Canada West Awards
Tatiana Rafter, 2013-14 Canada West Player of the Year
Canada West All-Stars
1997-98, Michelle Johansson
1998-99, Laura BennionFirst TeamLucie Fortin, 2003-04 Canada West First-Team All-Star   
Julia Staszewski, 2004-05 Canada West First-Team All-Star  
Haleigh Callison, 2005-06 Canada West First-Team All-Star 
Danielle Dube, 2012-13 Canada West First-Team All-Star
Kelly Murray, 2016-17 Canada West First-Team All-Star
Cassandra Vilgrain, 2016-17 Canada West First-Team All-Star
Celine Tardif, 2017-18 Canada West First-Team All-StarsSecond Team'Lucie Fortin, 2002-03 Canada West Second-Team All-Star   
Teryne Russell, 2004-05 Canada West Second-Team All-Star  
Christi Capozzi, 2012-13 Canada West Second-Team All-Star
Tatiana Rafter, 2012-13 Canada West Second-Team All-Star
Kelly Murray, 2015-16 Canada West Second-Team All-Star
Rebecca Unrau, 2015-16 Canada West Second-Team All-Star
Hannah Clayton-Carroll, 2017-18 Canada West Second-Team All-Stars

Canada West All-Rookie
Mathea Fischer, 2015-16 Canada West All-Rookie Team 
Mairead Bast, 2016-17 Canada West All-Rookie Team 
Tory Micklash, 2016-17 Canada West All-Rookie Team  
Shay-Lee McConnell, 2017-18 Canada West All-Rookie Team 
Ireland Perrott, 2017-18 Canada West All-Rookie Team 
Rylind MacKinnon, 2018-19 Canada West All-Rookie Team 
Ashley McFadden, 2018-19 Canada West All-Rookie Team
Kennesha Miswaggon, 2019-20 Canada West All-Rookie Team

UBC Awards
2012-13 Du Vivier Team of the Year Award
2014-15: Lauren Logush - UBC Thunderbirds Female Rookie of the Year
2015-16 Danielle Dube: May Brown Trophy - Graduating Female Athlete of the Year
2019-20 TAC Buzz Moore Leadership Award: Mikayla Ogrodniczuk Co-winner
Laura Bennion: UBC Hall of Fame Inductees (Builder's Category)Kay Brearley Service Award (Community Service)
2019 Kay Brearley Service Award: Shiayli Toni 
2020 Kay Brearley Service Award : Mikayla Ogrodniczuk Carolyn Dobie-Smith Award'' (Student-Trainer Award)
2019 Carolyn Dobie-Smith Award: Walee Malik Co-Winner
2020 Carolyn Dobie-Smith Award: Luisa Ribeiro

References

UBC Thunderbirds
U Sports women's ice hockey teams
Women's ice hockey teams in Canada
Ice hockey teams in British Columbia
Women in British Columbia